Moneoa Moshesh-Sowazi (born ), is a South African singer-songwriter and actress mononymously known as Moneoa. She came to prominence after the release of her singles, "Is'Bhanxa" and "Pretty Disaster", the latter remixed by Da Capo.

She has starred in a Johannesburg ghetto film circulating (if not projecting) around the 1958 Sophia Town violence against the law enforcement titled Back of the Moon where she portrays Eve Msomi alongside the award-winning S'Dumo Mtshali.

Discography

List of Studio Albums

Filmography

Television

Films

Awards and nominations

World Music Awards

South African Music Awards

References

External links 
 
 

1989 births
Living people
House musicians
South African record producers
South African musicians
People from Mthatha
People from the Eastern Cape
South African singers
South African songwriters
South African women singer-songwriters
Sotho people
21st-century rappers
21st-century South African musicians
21st-century women rappers